The San Agustín was a 74-gun ship of the line built at the royal shipyard in Guarnizo (Santander) and launched in 1768.<ref>p208-9, 226-7, Goodwin The Ships of Trafalgar, the British, French and Spanish Fleets October 1805. Page 208 says launched 1768, whilst 226 says launched 1769</ref>

She was captured by Portugal in 1776, but returned the following year.

In January 1780, during the American War of Independence, she was part of a squadron of 11 of the line under command of Admiral Don Juan de Lángara left on patrol off Cape St. Vincent to intercept an expected British convoy for Gibraltar. But, when it appeared, the British fleet, under Sir George Rodney, greatly outnumbered the Spanish squadron, with 18 ships of the line. The result was the Battle of Cape St. Vincent (1780), off the stormy, dark cliffs of Cape Santa María through the afternoon and evening of 16 January 1780. Six Spanish ships of the line were captured and one destroyed. The San Agustín and San Genaro'' were the only Spanish ships of the line to escape unscathed.

During the Napoleonic wars, she fought at the Battle of Algeciras in 1801 and the Battle of Trafalgar in 1805.

References and notes

 

Ships of the line of the Spanish Navy
1768 ships
Ships built in Spain
Maritime incidents in 1805
Shipwrecks in the Atlantic Ocean
Shipwrecks of Spain